Hasselhoff is a surname of German, Austrian and Dutch roots. Notable people with this surname include the following:  
 David Hasselhoff (born 1952), American actor and singer
 Hayley Hasselhoff (born 1992), American actress, daughter of David
 Jared Hasselhoff (born 1971), American musician

German-language surnames